Andreas Pospich (born 8 December 1961) is a retired German footballer. He spent one season with Eintracht Braunschweig in the Bundesliga, as well as five seasons in the 2. Bundesliga. At the end of his career he also had a brief stint with Stahl Eisenhüttenstadt, playing two games in the 1991–92 European Cup Winners' Cup.

References

External links
 

1961 births
Living people
People from Salzgitter
Footballers from Lower Saxony
German footballers
Eintracht Braunschweig players
Eisenhüttenstädter FC Stahl players
Association football forwards
Association football defenders
Bundesliga players
2. Bundesliga players
Association football midfielders